The 2014 NCAA Women's Division I Swimming and Diving Championships were contested at the 33rd annual NCAA-sanctioned swim meet to determine the team and individual national champions of Division I women's collegiate swimming and diving in the United States. 

This year's events were hosted by the University of Minnesota at the University Aquatic Center in Minneapolis, Minnesota. 

Defending champions Georgia again topped the team standings, finishing 125.5 points ahead of Stanford. This was the Lady Bulldogs' sixth women's team title.

Team standings
Note: Top 10 only
(H) = Hosts
(DC) = Defending champions
Full results

Swimming results

See also
List of college swimming and diving teams

References

NCAA Division I Swimming And Diving Championships
NCAA Division I Swimming And Diving Championships
NCAA Division I Women's Swimming and Diving Championships